L'église Saint-Martin  is a church  in  Chavenon in the Allier département in the Auvergne Region.

History
The church was erected in the 12th century. This church belongs to the Diocese of Moulins, suffragan of the archdiocese of Clermont. It is a listed historical monument since 1933.

References

External links 
  Eglise Saint-Martin

Note
Summed up and translated from the equivalent article at French Wikipédia, 29 May 2008

Churches in Allier
12th-century Roman Catholic church buildings in France